Rusheen McDonald (born 17 August 1992) is a Jamaican sprinter. Competing at the 2012 Summer Olympics, Rusheen was in the 400 metres and 4 x 400 metres relay.

Rusheen qualified for the 2012 Summer Olympics, after placing second in the 400 metres at the Jamaican Olympic Trials, with a time of 45.1 seconds. In the 400 preliminaries at the Olympics, Rusheen placed fourth in his heat with a time of 46.67 seconds, failing to qualify for the semi-finals.

In 2015, Rusheen qualified for the 15th World Championships in Athletics after placing second in the 400 metres at the Jamaican National Championships, with a time of 44.73 seconds. Two months after, in the 400 heats at the World Championships, Rusheen placed second with a time of 43.93 seconds breaking Jermaine Gonzales's Jamaican record.  As of 2018, his time ranks him in the top 15 in history.

References

1992 births
Living people
Jamaican male sprinters
Athletes (track and field) at the 2012 Summer Olympics
Athletes (track and field) at the 2016 Summer Olympics
Olympic athletes of Jamaica
Athletes (track and field) at the 2014 Commonwealth Games
Athletes (track and field) at the 2018 Commonwealth Games
World Athletics Championships athletes for Jamaica
World Athletics Championships medalists
Olympic silver medalists for Jamaica
Olympic silver medalists in athletics (track and field)
Medalists at the 2016 Summer Olympics
Athletes (track and field) at the 2019 Pan American Games
Pan American Games competitors for Jamaica
Commonwealth Games competitors for Jamaica